Sarah A. Wescot-Williams (born 8 April 1956) is the leader of the Democratic Party of Sint Maarten and the first Prime Minister of Sint Maarten. Even though her party only managed to secure two seats in the Sint Maarten general election of 2010, she was selected as Prime Minister in the coalition agreement between United People and the Democratic Party.

Following the collapse of the first Wescot-Williams cabinet in April 2012, she was again designated Prime Minister in the second Wescot-Williams cabinet installed on 21 May 2012.
On 19 December 2014 Wescot-Williams was succeeded as prime minister by Marcel Gumbs.

References

External links
 Government website presenting Prime Minister Sarah Wescot-Williams Archived 2014-02-28

Living people
1956 births
Prime Ministers of Sint Maarten
Presidents of the Parliament of Sint Maarten
Members of the Parliament of Sint Maarten
Democratic Party Sint Maarten politicians
Sint Maarten women in politics
Women prime ministers
21st-century Dutch women politicians
21st-century Dutch politicians
La Salle University alumni